Aedes cordellieri is a sub-Saharan African species of mosquito suspected of being a vector of yellow fever.  The species name honors Dr. Roger Cordellier, a former medical entomologist with Office de la Recherche Scientifique et Technique Outre-Mer (ORSTOM) in Ivory Coast, in recognition of his contributions to the knowledge of the mosquito fauna of Africa.

Bionomics

Ae. cordellieri is found in West Africa (Ivory Coast), East Africa (Kenya, Tanzania, Uganda) and South Africa.

The eggs of the type species were obtained from a female collected while biting a human 20 meters above ground level, in the evening, in a forest area at Dézidougou, M'Bahiakro, Centre Departement, Ivory Coast. In nature, immature stages of Ae. cordellieri have been collected from tree holes. Aedes cordellieri feeds readily on monkeys and humans through the summer until the onset of winter.

Medical importance

Ae. cordellieri from eastern Africa (Uganda, Kenya and Tanzania) and South Africa (Natal) have been demonstrated to be capable of transmitting yellow fever virus through bites under laboratory conditions.

References

cordellieri
Insects described in 1986